"Push Back" is a 2018 dancehall song by American singers Ne-Yo and Bebe Rexha and British singer/rapper Stefflon Don. The song is included on Ne-Yo's seventh studio album Good Man, which was released in June 2018.

Background
Ne-Yo spoke of the song, stating "I love a woman who knows how to move. I love a woman that has her own self, her own heart and mind. She's comfortable with her body. And when her song comes on, she's gonna get up and move. She's gonna show you just how confident and comfortable she is. 'Push Back' is about these women."

Music video
The music video directed by James Larese was released on April 10, 2018.

Track listing

Release history

References

External links
 

 

2018 songs
2018 singles
Ne-Yo songs
Songs written by Ne-Yo
Bebe Rexha songs
Stefflon Don songs
Songs written by Bebe Rexha
Song recordings produced by Stargate (record producers)
Songs written by Tor Erik Hermansen
Songs written by Mikkel Storleer Eriksen
Motown singles
Dancehall songs
Songs written by Stefflon Don